Loharda is a town and a nagar panchayat in Dewas district in the Indian state of Madhya Pradesh.

Demographics
 India census, Loharda had a population of 8,101. Males constitute 52% of the population and females 48%. Loharda has an average literacy rate of 48%, lower than the national average of 59.5%: male literacy is 60%, and female literacy is 35%. In Loharda, 18% of the population is under 6 years of age.

References

Cities and towns in Dewas district